This is a list of newspapers in New Jersey.  There were, as of 2020, over 300 newspapers in print in New Jersey.  Historically, there have been almost 2,000 newspapers published in New Jersey. The Constitutional Courant, founded in 1765 in Woodbridge, New Jersey, is the earliest known New Jersey newspaper.

Daily newspapers
This is a list of all daily newspapers as of 2020 in New Jersey from the New Jersey Press Association Directory and other sources.

Special interest newspapers
 Amerikai Magyar népszava, szabadság (American Hungarian people's voice, liberty) East Brunswick, founded in 199?, 
 The Armenian Reporter, Armenian interest, Paramus, founded in 2006, 
 Attan-akamik News, Powhatan Renape Nation, Rancocas, founded in 198?, 
 The Aquarian Weekly
 El Especialito, Spanish language, Union City, owned by USA Distributors, Inc.
 The Italian Tribune, Italian interests, Newark, founded in 1999, 
 Jewish Times of South Jersey, Jewish interest, Pleasantville, founded in 2000, publisher: Jewish Times, 
 Latinos Unidos de Neuva Jersey, Spanish language 
 The Manila Times East, Filipino issues, Jersey City, founded in 1986, publisher: Manila Times East, 
 New Jersey Jewish News, Jewish interest, Whippany, founded in 1998, publisher: Jewish Times, 
 Pol-Am Journal, official newspaper, Association of the Sons of Poland, Jersey City, published in Scranton, Pennsylvania, 
 Quisqueya News, Spanish language, Newark, founded in 2002
 The Arab Voice ( Ṣawt al-ʻurūbah), Arabic-English language, Paterson, founded in 1993, publisher:  Dār Bīsān, 
 Svoboda, Jersey City, Ukrainian National Association' daily, Ukrainian language
 La Tribuna de New Jersey & New York, Spanish language, Union City, publisher: Ruth Molenaar, 
 Woman's Newspaper, women's issues, Princeton, New Jersey, founded in 1986, 
 Xin xiang zhou kan (Chinese News Weekly), Chinese language Edison, founded in 1995, publisher:  Chinese Newsweek Corp., 

Non-daily local newspapers

 Americké Listy - Perth Amboy
 The Anatolia Post https://theanatoliapost.com/
 Anointed News Journal - Camden
 Atlantic County Record - Atlantic City
 Atlanticville - Monmouth Beach/Long Branch/Ocean Township 
 The Beacon
 The Black River News
 Brazilian Press
 The Caldwell News
 Cape May County Herald - Cape May County, founded in 1968
 Cape May Star and Wave
 Cedar Grove Observer
 Cedar Grove/ Verona News
 The Chatham News
 The Cherry Hill Sun
 The Coast Star - Manasquan, Avon-By-The-Sea, Belmar, Bradley Beach, Brielle, Lake Como, Sea Girt, Spring Lake, Spring Lake Heights, Wall Township
 The Coaster - Asbury Park, founded in 1983
 Cranbury Press
 East Brunswick Sentinel - East Brunswick
 Edison Sentinel - Edison/Metuchen
 The East Hanover News
 The Florham Park News
 The Florham Park Eagle - Florham Park
 Florham Park Hanover this Week - Florham Park, Hanover
 The Galloway Patriot - Galloway Township
 The Grapevine Newspaper - Vineland
 The Hackettstown News
 The Haddonfield Sun
 The Hanover News
 Hammonton Gazette - Hammonton
 Hillsborough Beacon
  The HomeTown News - Wayne, Lincoln Park, Pequannock, Pompton Plains, Montville, Towaco, PineBrook, Fairfield, Pompton Lakes, Bloomingdale, Riverdale, Butler, Kinnelon, SmokeRise
 Hopewell Valley News
 The Hudson Reporter - Hudson County, with eight editions: Bayonne Community News, Hoboken Reporter, Jersey City Reporter, North Bergen Reporter, Union City Reporter, Secaucus Reporter, Weehawken Reporter, West New York Reporter 
 The Hunterdon County Democrat - Flemington, Hunterdon County, founded in 1847, 
 The Independent - Aberdeen, Middletown, Keyport/Matawan, Holmdel, Hazlet
 The Independent Press - Summit
 The Item of Millburn and Short Hills - Millburn, founded in 1975, 
 Jersey City Independent hyperlocal digital news 
 The Lawrence Ledger
 The Livingston News 
 The Madison News
 The Manville News
 The Marlton Sun
 The Medford Sun
 The Mendham News
 The Messenger-Press
 The Millburn/Short Hills News 
 Micromedia Publications
 The Montgomery News (Montgomery Township and Rocky Hill)
 The Morristown News
 The Moorestown Sun
 The Monmouth Journal - Red Bank
 Montclair Local (Website)
 The Montclair Times - Montclair
 The Mount Olive News
 The Mt. Laurel Sun
 New Brunswick Today
 Northern Valley Press
 The Nubian News
 The Observer - Kearny, New Jersey serving West Hudson & South Bergen
 Ocean City Sentinel
 The Ocean Star - Bay Head, Brick Township, Lavallette, Mantoloking, Point Pleasant Beach, Point Pleasant Borough
 Pascack Press
 Pascack Valley Community Life
 The Pine Barrens Tribune -- serving the following communities mainly in Burlington County: Southampton, Medford, Evesham, Woodland, Tabernacle, Pemberton, Shamong, Bass River, and Washington townships, Medford Lakes and Pemberton Boroughs, as well as parts of western and southern Ocean County, northern Atlantic County and the Pinelands Regional School District.
 The Princeton Packet
 The Randolph News
 The Register-News
 River View Observer - Hudson County
 The Roxbury News
 [[The Scotch Plains-Fanwood Times]]
 The Shamong Sun
 Sokol Times - East Orange
 South Brunswick Post, South Brunswick, 
 Summit Herald-Dispatch - Summit
 The Tabernacle Sun
 TAPinto, hyperlocal digital news in 50+ towns
 Town Topics - Princeton
 triCityNews - Monmouth County
 The Two River Times - Red Bank
 The Westfield Leader - Westfield founded 1890 (Website)
 Union County Local Source
 Verona-Cedar Grove Times
 The Voorhies Sun
 The West Orange News
 Windsor-Hights Herald

College newspapers
The Daily Princetonian
The Daily Targum
The Newark Targum

Defunct newspapers
Gloucester County Times of Woodbury, founded in 1897, ceased publication in 2012, 
Hudson Dispatch
Passaic Daily News (1891-1929)
The Hudson County Democrat of Hoboken, New Jersey, founded in 1854, ceased publication in 1883, 
The News of Cumberland County of Bridgeton, founded in 1879, ceased publication in 2012, 
Today's Sunbeam of Salem, founded in 1819 (originally Salem Messenger), ceased publication in 2012, 

See also
List of African-American newspapers in New Jersey
Hi's Eye
NJ.com
New York City media
Media of Philadelphia
Adjoining states
 List of newspapers in Delaware
 List of newspapers in Pennsylvania
 List of newspapers in New York

References

Further reading
 . (About NJ local news)

External links
 
 . (Survey of local news existence and ownership in 21st century)

New Jersey
 List of newspapers in New Jersey